Rasha Omran is one of the most important Syrian poetesses, author of seven collections of poems and an anthology of Syrian poetry.

Biography 
Born in Tartus, Syria, in 1964 into a family of artists, Rasha Omran is the daughter of Syrian poet Mohammad Omran a poet, activist, and journalist, and their home was a cultural gathering place for intellectuals and artists. As a child she read freely in her family library and she later attended Damascus University to study Arabic literature. She founded the Al-Sindiyan Festival of Litterature and Culture in her hometown in the late 1990s, which she directed for 16 years, and published her first poems after the death of her father. She has published seven collections of poetry and is the editor of an anthology of contemporary Syrian poets. 

Since the beginning of the Syrian revolution, she has publicly given her support for the uprising.  “This is a dictatorial regime, [....] How can I support a government that kills its citizens?” She has marched in protests, written about her dissent, and spoken out against Assad.  Assad is "not a dictator, just a gangster boss." 
It was Rasha Omran who coined the phrase, "the international silence on Syria is deafening.". Threatened along with her family by the Syrian regime, she went into exile in Cairo in 2012. In September 2012, Rasha Omran and four other Syrian women launched a hunger strike outside the Arab League's headquarters in Tahrir Square, Cairo, Egypt, demanding that the Arab League provides more support for the revolutionaries, and pressure Assad to halt the human rights abuses in Syria.

She has lived in Cairo since 2012 where she continues to write and publish her poetry, as well as three weekly articles for online Arab media where she comments on political and cultural news.

Bibliography 
زوجة سرية للغياب (A secret wife of absence). Poems. Al Mutawassit, Milan 2020

التي سكنت البيت قبلي (She who dwelt in the house before me). Poems. Al Mutawassit, Milan 2016

بانوراما الموت والوحشة (Panorama of death and solitude). Poems. Dar Non 2014

معطف أحمر فارغ (A red and empty coat). Poems. Syrian Culture Ministry 2009

ظلك الممتد في أقصى حنيني (Your Shadow, Cast in my Utter Yearning). Poems. Al Tanweer 2003

كأن منفاي جسدي (As though my Exile my Body). Poems. Dar Arwad 1999

وجع له شكل الحياة (Pain in the Form of Life). Poems. Dar Arwad 1997

أنطولوجيا الشعر السوري (Anthologie de la poésie syrienne 1980-2008) الأمانة العامة لإحتفالية دمشق  عاصمة الثقافة العربية, Damas 2008

Translations

English 
3 Poems from A Secret Wife of Absence translation Phoebe Carter

Other Poems from A Secret Wife of Absence translation Phoebe Carter

Defy the Silence translation Kim Echlin et Abdelrehim Youssef

If I Were a Cat Rasha Omran’s Poetry in Three Languages

When longing tormented me translation Camilo Gomez-Rivas

References

External links

Further reading
 
 

1964 births
Living people
People of the Syrian civil war
Syrian democracy activists
Syrian dissidents
Syrian feminists
People from Tartus
Syrian Alawites
Syrian poets
Arabic poetry